Reddick is a surname. Notable people with the surname include:

Alzo J. Reddick (born 1937), American politician
Anthony Reddick (born 1985), American football player who played in Canadian Football League
Cat Reddick (born 1982), American soccer player
David Reddick (born 1971), American artist, illustrator and cartoonist
DeWitt Carter Reddick (1904–1980), American journalist and professor
Eunice S. Reddick (born 1951), American diplomat
Haason Reddick (born 1994), American football player
Jaret Reddick (born 1972), lead vocalist / rhythm guitarist for rock band Bowling for Soup
Jeffrey Reddick (born 1969), American screenwriter
John B. Reddick (1845–1898), American politician
Josh Reddick (born 1987), American baseball player
Julie Reddick (born 1983), Canadian curler
Kevin Reddick (born 1989), American football player
Lance Reddick (1962–2023), American actor and musician
Lawrence D. Reddick (1910–1995), American historian
Paul Reddick, Canadian singer-songwriter and musician
Percy Reddick (1896–1978), Archdeacon of Bristol
Pokey Reddick (born 1964), Canadian ice hockey goaltender
Stan Reddick (born 1969), Canadian ice hockey goaltender
Tom Reddick (1912–1982), English cricketer
Troy Reddick (born 1983), American football player
Tyler Reddick (born 1996), American race car driver
William Reddick (politician) (1812–1885), American politician
William H. Reddick (1840–1903), American soldier, Congressional Medal of Honor recipient

See also
Redick (surname)